Patriarch Theodotus of Constantinople may refer to:

 Theodotus I of Constantinople, Ecumenical Patriarch in 815–821
 Theodotus II of Constantinople, Ecumenical Patriarch in 1151–1153